Clube de Futebol Os Unidos, or more commonly Unidos de Lisboa, is a Portuguese football club established as Grupo Desportivo CUF de Lisboa (commonly known as CUF Lisboa, with CUF standing for the company Companhia União Fabril) in 1936.



History
Established as Grupo Desportivo da CUF Lisboa (CUF Lisboa, with CUF standing for the company Companhia União Fabril) in 1937, it was one of three football clubs created by the parent company, whose players were also workers (the other clubs were CUF Barreiro, founded in 1937 and the most successful of the three, and the short-lived CUF Porto that existed between 1945 and 1950). In 1940, the Estado Novo forced the club to change its name, as it didn't allow sports teams with corporate names. Thus the club changed its name to Clube de Futebol Os Unidos or Unidos de Lisboa (CUF Barreiro, meanwhile changed to Unidos Futebol Clube or Unidos do Barreiro). It was during this period that the club had its most successful spell, playing three consecutive  seasons, from 1940–41 to 1942–43, in the Primeira Divisão, when qualification was obtained through the district championships. They also reached the national cup semi-finals in 1941 and 1942. In 1944, the prohibition of corporate names ended, and Unidos reverted to CUF Lisboa. In 1945, they were runners-up in the Segunda Divisão, back then the second-tier national league. The club dissolved in 1947 for lack of a ground, but returned to the Lisbon FA district championships in 1954, under the Unidos de Lisboa name, seemingly choosing to ignore its CUF connections. The last senior team to play was on the 2008–09 in the Lisbon FA First Division (district second tier). Nowadays, they only run junior teams.

League and cup history

References

External links
Official website
Facebook page
Footballzz.com profile

Football clubs in Portugal
Sport in Lisbon
Association football clubs established in 1936
1936 establishments in Portugal
Primeira Liga clubs